Kathleen Watkins (born 17 October 1934) is an Irish broadcaster, harpist, actress, singer and author. She is the widow of Gay Byrne.

She played Grace Gifford in the 1966 docudrama Insurrection. She hosted the Rose of Tralee in 1977, the only woman so far to do so.

References

External links

1934 births
Living people
People from Howth
Rose of Tralee hosts